The Basrah Museum is a museum in the Iraqi city of Basra, housed in a former palace of Saddam Hussein. Its collection is related to Mesopotamian, Babylonian, Persian civilisations, as well as the history of the city itself. Basrah Museum opened its doors to the public in March 2019. The Director of the Basrah Antiquities & Heritage is Qahtan Al Abeed, who has managed the project from the start with the cooperation of the State Board of Antiquities & Heritage and the Ministry of Culture and with support from the UK Friends of Basrah Museum.

History
The museum was closed in 1991, when it was among nine museums looted by mobs opposed to Saddam Hussein at the close of the first Gulf War. 

The Basrah Museum opened its first Gallery of the Museum in September 2016. The Friends of Basrah Museum is the organisation that raised the funds for the first gallery's installation through generous corporate and individual donations. FOBM  received a UK Cultural Protection Fund [CPF] Grant award in December 2016, managed by the British Council in partnership with the Department of Digital, Culture, Media and Sport to support the completion of the new Basrah Museum. The London-based British Museum was also one of the Western organisations which supported the Basrah Museum at the start of the project in 2010.

The museum officially opened its doors to the public in March 2019 with three new galleries: Babylon, Sumer and Assyrian. With the assistance of the Iraq Museum and the Basrah Museum  thousands of artefacts dating back as far as BCE 6,000 are back on display in the southern province. These include artefacts from the original museum looted in 1991 that are now on display in the Basrah Gallery. The museum now has labels in English and Arabic throughout all four galleries, worked on by Qahtan Alabeed and others with assistance from the Friends of Basrah Museum and The British Institute for the Study of Iraq for the English language labels.

References

External links

Basra Museum project briefing (British Museum)

Museums in Iraq
Buildings and structures in Basra